Patissa monostidzalis is a moth in the family Crambidae. It was described by George Hampson in 1919. It is found in Nigeria.

The wingspan is about 20 mm. The forewings are silvery white with a small black spot at the lower angle of the cell. The hindwings are silvery white.

References

Endemic fauna of Nigeria
Moths described in 1919
Schoenobiinae